[[File:Wilhelm Amberg In Gedanken versunken.jpg|thumbnail|upright|Wilhelm Amberg: In Gedanken versunken - Lost in thoughts]]

Wilhelm Amberg (born 25 February 1822 in Berlin, died 10 September 1899 in Berlin) was a German genre painter.

Biography

He was educated by the painters Carl Joseph Begas in Berlin and Léon Cogniet in Paris (1845). After this he spent a couple of years in Rome. His paintings are characterized by humour and a poetic atmosphere. Wilhelm Amberg has won many awards and from 1886 was a Member of the Senate of the Prussian Academy of Arts, Berlin.

Works

The painting depicting A reading from the novel The Sorrows of Young Werther shows five young girls seated in a romantic spot in the nature, who went outdoors to read from this novel. One of them is crying, leaning on the other girl's shoulders. The other one is leaning towards the girl reading, with intense attentiveness, also having a handkerchief in her hand, the same as the girl sitting beside the reader. She also has one, that is beside her placed on the  vegetation overgrown with moss she sits on ... all the young girls are moved by the lecture.

Soon after its publication in 1774, young women were impressed by the novel and young men began to dress in yellow pants and blue jackets, like young Werther, the main character in the novel.  Werther shoots himself with a pistol after he is rejected by the woman he loves, and shortly after its publication there were many reports of young men using the same method to kill themselves in an act of hopelessness.

 Selected works 

 Trost in Tönen Der Witwe Trost Die Liebespost Die rauchende Zofe Naschkätzchen Vorlesung aus Goethes "Werther"  Literature 
 
 Irmgard Wirth: Berliner Malerei im 19. Jahrhundert''. Siedler Verlag, Berlin 1990, S. 433.

References

External links

1822 births
1899 deaths
19th-century German painters
19th-century German male artists
German male painters
German genre painters
Artists from Berlin